Peter Cawley (born 15 September 1965) is an English former footballer who played as a defender.

Career

Cawley is best known for his spell at Colchester United, where he made more than 200 appearances during his six years at the club between 1992 and 1998. He missed a crucial penalty as Colchester lost the 1997 Football League Trophy Final in a shootout against Carlisle United.

He began his career at Wimbledon from 1985 to 1989, making a handful of appearance in the Football League First Division and also taking to the field at Wembley Stadium for the 1988 FA Charity Shield.

After retiring, Cawley spent time obtaining all his coaching qualifications and obtaining a BSc in Sports Science and Coaching. Having worked initially at Wimbledon FC's successful academy, he was recruited by Laurie Sanchez at Wycombe Wanderers. His stay here ended after a brief spell as assistant manager to Tony Adams. Following Adams' resignation in November 2004, Cawley was sacked by the club. Having been disheartened by his experience he went on to become a London black cab driver.

Honours

Club
Wimbledon
 FA Charity Shield runner-up: 1988

Southend United
 Football League Third Division runner-up: 1990–91

Colchester United
 Football League Trophy runner-up: 1996–97

References

External links

1965 births
Living people
People from Walton-on-Thames
English footballers
Association football defenders
Chertsey Town F.C. players
Walton Casuals F.C. players
Wimbledon F.C. players
Koparit players
Bristol Rovers F.C. players
Fulham F.C. players
Southend United F.C. players
Exeter City F.C. players
Barnet F.C. players
Colchester United F.C. players
English Football League players